Maxfield Township is one of fourteen townships in Bremer County, Iowa, USA.  As of the 2000 census, its population was 1,314.

Geography
According to the USGS, it contains six cemeteries: Emanuel Evangelical Lutheran, Saint Johns Lutheran, Saint Mathews Lutheran, Saint Pauls (two cemeteries of this name) and Zions.

References

External links
 US-Counties.com
 City-Data.com

Townships in Bremer County, Iowa
Waterloo – Cedar Falls metropolitan area
Townships in Iowa